Private Stock is the 1995 album by Atlanta, Georgia-based band The Grapes.

Track listing

Been Gone Too Long
If You Got A Gun
Salvation
Someday
Jozetta
Somewhere New
New Song
One Of These Days
Walking Under Ladders
Mama Flew
Above The Moon

References 

1995 albums
The Grapes (band) albums